Alfred Baker may refer to:

 Alfred Baker (academic)  (1848–1942), Canadian academic
 Alfred Baker (politician) (1870–1943), English politician and solicitor
 Alfred Joseph Baker (1846–1900), played for England in England v Scotland representative matches (1870–1872)
 Alfred L. Baker (financer), father of Mary Landon Baker
 Alf Baker (1898–1955), English footballer with Arsenal and England
 Brownie Baker (1889–1939), Canadian professional ice hockey player

See also
Al Baker (disambiguation)